Elizabeth Lawrence may refer to:

Elizabeth Bury (1644–1720), née Lawrence, English diarist
Eliza Lawrence, former politician in the Northwest Territories
Elizabeth Lawrence (actress) (1922–2000), American Broadway and film actress
Elizabeth Lawrence (author) (1904 - 1985), American garden writer and landscape architect

See also
Elizabeth Lawrence House and Garden, a historic home and garden located at Charlotte, Mecklenburg County, North Carolina
Elizabeth Township, Lawrence County, Ohio, United States
Elizabeth Laurence (born 1949), English classical mezzo-soprano singer